Zhalauly, is a salt lake in Irtysh District, Pavlodar Region, Kazakhstan.

Road R-170 passes close to the northwestern end of the lake.

Geography
Zhalauly is an endorheic lake lying at the southern end of the Ishim Plain. It consists of a larger western lake and a smaller eastern one, connected at the northern end by a sound. There are small salt flats and salt marshes to the northeast. The lakeshores are dissected and largely swampy. The lake freezes in early November and thaws in late April.

During periods of drought the lake may completely dry up, but in rare years of exceptional snowfall, the waters of the Shiderti river (Karasu) may completely fill lake Shyganak to the south and the overflow may reach lake Zhalauli.

See also 
List of lakes of Kazakhstan

References

External links

Озера и реки Казахстана (in Russian)

Lakes of Kazakhstan
Endorheic lakes of Asia
Pavlodar Region
West Siberian Plain